Wang Zhixin ((August 17, 1868 – October 23, 1914) was a Chinese politician of the Republic of China era. He was born in Yantai, Shandong. He was an associate of Zhao Bingjun during the later years of the Qing Dynasty. A member of the Beiyang government, he served as the 3rd mayor of Beijing (October 16, 1913 – March 23, 1914). On June 27, 1914, on the orders of Yuan Shikai, Wang was arrested and imprisoned for his involvement in the assassination of Song Jiaoren. Wang's downfall was related to his association with Zhao, who had mysteriously died during his tenure as mayor. On Yuan's orders, Wang was executed.

References

Bibliography
 「民国初年北京市市長王治馨墓志銘現身莱陽（図）」2008.6.2. 新華網（『煙台日報』が原典）
 
 

1868 births
1914 deaths
Mayors of Beijing
Chinese police officers
Executed Republic of China people
Politicians from Yantai
Republic of China politicians from Shandong
People executed by the Republic of China
Executed people from Shandong